Agelasta praelongipes is a species of beetle in the family Cerambycidae. It was described by Kusama and Irie in 1976.

References

praelongipes
Beetles described in 1976